

Nicolae Suruceanu (1891 – 1969) was a Bessarabian politician. He was born in Suruceni.

Biography 
He served as Member of the Moldovan Parliament (1917–1918).

Gallery

Bibliography 
Gheorghe E. Cojocaru, Sfatul Țării: itinerar, Civitas, Chişinău, 1998,  
Mihai Taşcă, Sfatul Țării şi actualele autorităţi locale, "Timpul de dimineaţă", no. 114 (849), June 27, 2008 (page 16)

External links 
 Arhiva pentru Sfatul Tarii 
 Deputaţii Sfatului Ţării şi Lavrenti Beria

Notes

1891 births
1969 deaths
Moldovan MPs 1917–1918